Petra Uhlig (born 22 July 1954) is a former East German handball player who competed in the 1976 Summer Olympics and in the 1980 Summer Olympics.

In 1976 she won the silver medal with the East German team. She played all five matches and scored five goals.

Four years later she won the bronze medal as a member of the East German. She played all five matches and scored six goals.

External links
profile

1954 births
Living people
German female handball players
Handball players at the 1976 Summer Olympics
Handball players at the 1980 Summer Olympics
Olympic handball players of East Germany
Olympic silver medalists for East Germany
Olympic bronze medalists for East Germany
Olympic medalists in handball
Medalists at the 1980 Summer Olympics
Medalists at the 1976 Summer Olympics
Recipients of the Patriotic Order of Merit